Erigeron clokeyi is a North American species of flowering plant in the family Asteraceae known by the common name Clokey's fleabane, or Clokey's daisy.

Erigeron clokeyiis native to the sage scrub of Nevada and far eastern California, and it can also be found in the talus of the eastern flank of Sierra Nevada. There are a few additional populations reported from Beaver County in Utah.

Erigeron clokeyiis a small perennial herb with leaves mostly around the base of the plant. The hairy, unbranching erect stems each hold an inflorescence of a single flower head which is about a centimeter (0.4 inches) wide. The head has a center of golden yellow disc florets and a fringe of sometimes as many as 55 very light to medium purple (occasionally white or pink) ray florets which are usually reflexed (bent away from the center).

Varieties
Erigeron clokeyi var. clokeyi - Charleston Mountains in Clark County in southern Nevada
Erigeron clokeyi var. pinzliae G.L.Nesom - California, Nevada, Utah

References

External links
Jepson Manual Treatment
United States Department of Agriculture Plants Profile
Calphotos Photo gallery, University of California
Photo of herbarium specimen at Missouri Botanical Garden, collected in Nevada in 1937, isotype of Erigeron clokeyi

clokeyi
Flora of California
Flora of Nevada
Plants described in 1947
Flora of Utah
Flora without expected TNC conservation status
Taxa named by Arthur Cronquist